Regional elections were held in Denmark in January 1906. 438 municipal council members were elected among the middle class. An additional 6 municipal council members were elected in Copenhagen.

References

1906
1906 elections in Europe
Elections